Johanelis Herrera Abreu (born 11 August 1995) is a Dominican-born Italian female hurdler who won a bronze medal at the 2018 Mediterranean Games. She competed at the 2020 Summer Olympics, in 4 × 100 m relay.

National records
 4 × 100 m relay: 48.90 ( Doha, 4 October 2019), she ran first leg in the team with Gloria Hooper, Anna Bongiorni, Irene Siragusa – current holder

Achievements

National Titles
 Italian Athletics Championships:
 100 m: 2018
 Italian Athletics Indoor Championships:
 60 m: 2019

See also
 Italy at the 2018 Mediterranean Games

References

External links

1995 births
Living people
Italian female sprinters
Athletes (track and field) at the 2018 Mediterranean Games
Mediterranean Games bronze medalists for Italy
Sportspeople from Santo Domingo
Naturalised citizens of Italy
Dominican Republic emigrants to Italy
Mediterranean Games medalists in athletics
World Athletics Championships athletes for Italy
European Games competitors for Italy
Athletes (track and field) at the 2019 European Games
Athletes (track and field) at the 2022 Mediterranean Games